Anna-Maria Hefele is a German overtone singer. Hefele is from Grafing near Munich.

This technique of singing polyphonic overtones is also known as "throat singing," and Hefele has been practicing it since 2005.

There are several styles of overtone singing found around the world. Canadian Inuit and several forms displayed in Mongolia and surrounding regions are the most recognized. Hefele's style is culturally practiced in the Siberian region of Tuva. This whistling vocal version is called sygyt.

The Huffington Post has commented on her "amazing ability" and her singing being "utterly bizarre". On 10 October 2014, she was number two on The Guardian's Viral Video Chart, with one online video titled Polyphonic Overtone Singing, which features Hefele as she demonstrates and explains overtones. As of June 2021, this video has received more than 18.9 million hits.

References

External links
Official website
YouTube: Polyphonic Overtone Singing-Anna-Maria Hefele
Hefele, Eklund & McAllister (2019). "Polyphonic Overtone Singing: an acoustic and physiological (MRI) analysis and a first-person description of a unique mode of singing". In: Mattias Heldner (ed.): Proceedings from Fonetik 2019, 10–12 June 2019, Stockholm, Sweden. PERILUS XXVII,  (print version),  (electronic version), pp. 91–96.

German women singers
Living people
Musicians from Munich
Year of birth missing (living people)
People from Ebersberg (district)
Throat singing